Marco Angolo del Moro, (commonly called Angeli), the son and pupil and assistant of Battista, flourished in the latter half of the 16th century at Venice and Verona. He assisted his father in his wall decorations at Murano. He also practised the art of engraving with considerable success.

References
 

Year of birth unknown
Year of death unknown
16th-century Italian painters
Italian male painters
Italian Renaissance painters
Italian engravers